Unknown Blonde is a 1934 American pre-Code crime drama film directed by Hobart Henley and starring Edward Arnold, Barbara Barondess and Dorothy Revier. It was released by the independent Majestic Pictures. It was based on the 1932 novel Collusion by Theodore D. Irwin. The film's sets were designed by the art director Ralph Oberg.

Synopsis
Frank Rodie emerges as a very successful divorce lawyer, embittered after his own wife tricks him into innocently appearing as a co-respondent in a case and then divorcing him so she could marry a wealthy stockbroker. His wife turns their daughter Judith against him and, now with her husband in financial difficulties, she is spending money that Frank sends for their daughter. He manages to get even by trapping his wife into a compromising situation after her husband sues for divorce. Finally Frank is called in to save his daughter's reputation when she is dragged into a divorce case, eventually winning her appreciation.

Cast

 Edward Arnold as Frank Rodie
 Barbara Barondess as 	Mrs. Van Brunt, Jr.
 Barry Norton as 	Bob Parker
 John Miljan as Frank Wilson
 Dorothy Revier as 	Helen Rodie
 Leila Bennett as The Maid
 Walter Catlett as 	Publicity Man
 Helen Jerome Eddy as 	Miss Adams
 Claude Gillingwater as 	Papa Van Brunt, Sr.
 Arletta Duncan as Judith Rodie
 Maidel Turner as 	Mrs Parker
 Franklin Pangborn as Male Co-Respondent
 Esther Muir as 	Mrs. Vail
 Clarence Wilson as 	Max Keibel
 Arthur Hoyt as 	Mr. Vail
 Franklyn Ardell as 	Rodie's Lawyer 
 Kernan Cripps as Detective 
 Henry Hall as Judge

References

Bibliography
 Pitts, Michael R. Poverty Row Studios, 1929–1940: An Illustrated History of 55 Independent Film Companies, with a Filmography for Each. McFarland & Company, 2005.

External links

1934 films
American drama films
1934 drama films
American black-and-white films
Films directed by Hobart Henley
Majestic Pictures films
Films about divorce
1930s English-language films
1930s American films